The 1930 Bremen state election was held on 30 November 1930 to elect the 120 members of the Bürgerschaft of Bremen.

Results

References

Bremen
Elections in Bremen (state)